Fábio Alexandre da Silva Coentrão (born 11 March 1988) is a Portuguese former professional footballer. Mainly a left-back, he also operated as a winger and occasionally as a defensive midfielder.

After starting playing professionally with Rio Ave, he signed for Benfica at 19, going on to be loaned several times before becoming an important member of the first team, as a left-back. In 2011, he joined Real Madrid.

A Portuguese international over eight years, Coentrão represented the nation in two World Cups and one European Championship.

Club career

Rio Ave
Born in Vila do Conde, Coentrão grew up in the Caxinas fishing neighbourhood, as did his long-time international teammates Bruno Alves and Hélder Postiga. He joined his hometown's Rio Ave F.C. in 2004 at the age of 16, playing three Primeira Liga games in the following season for a northern side that would be relegated. In 2006–07 he established himself as first-choice, as Rio Ave barely missed promotion back and had a good run in the Taça de Portugal, ended by Sporting CP with a 2–1 win in Lisbon; whilst playing for the club, he earned the nickname "Figo das Caxinas".

After that season, where he was voted the divisions' Breakthrough Player of the Year, many clubs showed interest in Coentrão, most notably Sporting and S.L. Benfica, with him choosing the latter in July 2007. His playing style was likened to that of Arjen Robben by World Soccer Magazine, in its 50 World Talents 2007 issue.

Benfica
On 1 January 2008, having received insignificant playing opportunities at Benfica, Coentrão joined Madeira's C.D. Nacional on loan until the end of the season. On 3 May, he scored twice in a 3–0 away victory against already crowned league champions FC Porto.

In the summer of 2008, Coentrão transferred to Real Zaragoza, freshly relegated into Spain's Segunda División. After almost no appearances during the campaign, however, he returned to Portugal and Rio Ave in January 2009, still owned by Benfica; on 15 February he scored after an individual effort, albeit in a 1–3 loss at Porto.

In late October 2009, Coentrão extended his contract with Benfica until 2015, with a release clause of €30 million. On 2 December, having played some matches for Benfica as a left back, he scored his first goal in European competition, against FC BATE Borisov of Belarus in a 2–1 away win in the group stage of the UEFA Europa League.

On 10 February 2010, Benfica sold 20% of Coentrão's economic rights on any future transfer to a third party owner, Benfica Stars Fund, along with other teammates. He was tagged at €15 million, with the fund paying €3 million. During that season, he had a breakthrough year, appearing in a total of 43 official games (2,851 minutes), as the club won the league and the Portuguese League Cup; he ended the season in style, as he was voted Portuguese League Breakthrough Player of the Year.

On 27 September 2010, fully established with both his club and the national team, 22-year-old Coentrão extended his contract with Benfica until 2016. On 2 November he scored his first career brace, helping to a 4–3 home defeat of Olympique Lyonnais in the group phase of the UEFA Champions League – in a 67-minute fast break, he combined with Carlos Martins to make it 4–0 for the hosts.

Real Madrid
On 5 July 2011, after extensive negotiations, Benfica and Real Madrid reached an agreement in principle over the transfer of Coentrão, who signed a six-year contract the same day for €30 million– Ezequiel Garay went in the other direction as part of the deal. He made his debut in a pre-season friendly against the Los Angeles Galaxy on the 16th, creating an assist for Karim Benzema. His first two official games were against FC Barcelona in the Supercopa de España: in the first leg, he came on as a substitute for Sami Khedira in the second half of a 2–2 home draw and played as a defensive midfielder, and he started as left back in the second match, a 3–2 loss at the Camp Nou.

Coentrão made his La Liga debut on 28 August 2011 at former club Zaragoza, appearing as a central midfielder in a 6–0 rout (90 minutes played). While he featured mostly in these positions, he was also deployed by manager José Mourinho as a right back, against Sporting de Gijón on 3 December and against Barcelona the following week, winning the league in his first year.

In the last minutes of the second matchday in the 2012–13 season, Coentrão was sent off after insulting referee Pérez Lasa whilst on the substitutes bench, in an eventual 2–1 defeat at Getafe CF. He subsequently received a four-match ban.

Coentrão scored his first goal with Real Madrid on 16 December 2012, netting after a Cristiano Ronaldo pass to help the hosts come from behind against RCD Espanyol, as the game eventually ended 2–2. On 2 September of the following year, Manchester United launched a late loan bid for him on transfer deadline day. It was accepted by the Spaniards, but the deal fell through when they failed to secure a replacement in Guilherme Siqueira from Granada CF, who subsequently joined Benfica on loan.

Coentrão started the play that led to Gareth Bale's individual effort for the 2–1 winner over Barcelona in the final of the Copa del Rey. He also started both legs of the Champions League semi-final against holders FC Bayern Munich as Real Madrid dismantled the opposition 5–0 on aggregate en route to their tenth European title, La Décima.

Still under manager Carlo Ancelotti, Coentrão was sparingly played in the 2014–15 campaign mainly due to injuries, with only five league starts out of nine appearances. On 26 August 2015, it was announced he was loaned to AS Monaco FC in a season-long move. He made his competitive debut against Gazélec Ajaccio on 13 September, replacing Adama Traoré in an eventual 1–0 away win, and scored his first goal for his new team 11 days later to help the visitors come from behind at Montpellier HSC to win it 3–2.

As Madrid won the league championship in 2016–17, in which Coentrão contributed with just three appearances. He himself admitted not being fit enough to represent the club; in the season's Champions League he appeared in two group stage games, and his team won the competition for the second consecutive time.

On 5 July 2017, Coentrão was loaned to Sporting in a season-long move, despite having stated that in Portugal he would only play for Benfica.

Rio Ave return
After terminating his contract with Real Madrid, Coentrão signed with Rio Ave for one season on 31 August 2018. He received 11 yellow cards and two red, was released on 30 June 2019 and did not find a new club for the start of 2019–20.

On 29 January 2020, Coentrão announced his retirement from professional football. In October, however, he agreed to a new one-year deal at the Estádio dos Arcos.

International career

An international for Portugal at youth level, Coentrão was voted MVP in the 2007 Madeira Cup for the under-20 team, also being crowned the competition's top scorer. Subsequently, he represented the nation in the 2007 FIFA U-20 World Cup and, two years later, made his under-21 debut, notably taking part in the Toulon Tournament and scoring a hat-trick in the 6–0 group stage rout of Qatar.

After consistent performances at Benfica, although he started rarely in the early 2009–10, Coentrão earned his first senior call-up in November 2009, for the decisive 2010 FIFA World Cup qualification playoffs against Bosnia and Herzegovina, and made his debut in the first leg on 14 November at the Estádio da Luz, playing 21 minutes in the 1–0 win.

Coentrão was chosen for Carlos Queiroz's squad of 23 for the final stages, starting as left-back ahead of another adapted player, Duda. He played all the matches in South Africa, in an eventual round-of-16 exit.

On 10 August 2011, Coentrão scored his first international goal, netting through a rare header in a 5–0 victory over Luxembourg. He played all the games and minutes at UEFA Euro 2012, acting as left-back for the semi-finalists.

Coentrão suffered an injury in the second half of Portugal's first game at the 2014 World Cup, against Germany, and was ruled out for the remainder of the tournament. He played a key role in a 2–1 home defeat of Serbia on 29 March 2015, which put them top of the Euro 2016 qualifying group, crossing for the opening goal by a Ricardo Carvalho header and then scoring the winner from João Moutinho's pass.

Coentrão missed Euro 2016, which Portugal won, due to a thigh injury, contracted in training with Monaco. He returned to action after 697 days for a 2018 World Cup qualifier against Hungary, but was stretchered off in the first half of an eventual 1–0 win in Budapest.

Coentrão was named in a preliminary 35-man squad for the 2018 World Cup in Russia, but he did not make the final cut.

Personal life
Coentrão's second cousin, Rui, was also a footballer in the same position. He spent most of his career with Varzim SC, and was a youth international.

After retiring from professional football, Coentrão decided to become a shipowner fisherman, following in the footsteps of his father. He told Empower Brands Channel: "Life in the sea is not a shame, as many people think. It is a job like any other. Not only that, the sea is beautiful and we need it. People who love the sea and who want to experience the sea need to follow their dream. It is also a job for the new generations. My father had a boat, he used to fish and I always went with him as a child. My life was the sea... the sea and fishing. Of course, I knew that football would one day end and that I should take a new direction in my life. And my happiness is this boat and this is the life I want to lead."

Career statistics

Club

1 Includes Supercopa de España and Supertaça Cândido de Oliveira.
2 Includes UEFA Super Cup and FIFA Club World Cup.

International
Appearances and goals by national team and year

Portugal score listed first, score column indicates score after each Coentrão goal

Honours
Benfica
Primeira Liga: 2009–10
Taça da Liga: 2009–10, 2010–11
Supertaça Cândido de Oliveira runner-up: 2010

Real Madrid
La Liga: 2011–12, 2016–17
Copa del Rey: 2013–14
Supercopa de España: 2012
UEFA Champions League: 2013–14, 2016–17
UEFA Super Cup: 2014
FIFA Club World Cup: 2014, 2016

Sporting CP
Taça da Liga: 2017–18
Taça de Portugal runner-up: 2017–18

Individual
Liga de Honra Breakthrough Player of the Year: 2006–07
Primeira Liga Breakthrough Player of the Year: 2009–10
L'Équipe Ideal Eleven: 2010
Cosme Damião Award – Footballer of the Year: 2011
Primeira Liga Young Player of the Month: October 2009, March 2010, April 2010, September 2010
UEFA Euro Team of the Tournament: 2012

References

External links

1988 births
Living people
People from Vila do Conde
Sportspeople from Porto District
Portuguese footballers
Association football defenders
Association football wingers
Association football utility players
Primeira Liga players
Liga Portugal 2 players
Rio Ave F.C. players
S.L. Benfica footballers
C.D. Nacional players
Sporting CP footballers
La Liga players
Segunda División players
Real Zaragoza players
Real Madrid CF players
Ligue 1 players
AS Monaco FC players
UEFA Champions League winning players
Portugal youth international footballers
Portugal under-21 international footballers
Portugal international footballers
2010 FIFA World Cup players
UEFA Euro 2012 players
2014 FIFA World Cup players
Portuguese expatriate footballers
Expatriate footballers in Spain
Expatriate footballers in Monaco
Portuguese expatriate sportspeople in Spain
Portuguese expatriate sportspeople in Monaco